Herman Heinecke (November 14, 1859 – September 11, 1906) was an American businessman and politician.

Born in Sheboygan, Wisconsin, Heinecke went to school in Sheboygan, Wisconsin and was a carriage painter, From 1881 to 1884, Heinecke worked in Iowa and Hancock, Michigan. Then, in 1884, Heinecke returned to Sheboygan and worked as a butcher. Heinecke served on the Sheboygan Common Council and was a Republican. In 1905, Heinecke served in the Wisconsin State Assembly and died while still in office.

Notes

1859 births
1906 deaths
People from Sheboygan, Wisconsin
Businesspeople from Wisconsin
Wisconsin city council members
Republican Party members of the Wisconsin State Assembly
19th-century American politicians
19th-century American businesspeople